Conospermum longifolium, commonly known as the long leaf smokebush, is a shrub of the family Proteaceae native to eastern Australia. Found between Ulladulla, Newcastle, New South Wales and the adjacent ranges. The habitat is drier eucalyptus woodlands or heathland.

Three sub-species are recognised:
 Conospermum longifolium subsp. angustifolium
 Conospermum longifolium subsp. longifolium
 Conospermum longifolium subsp. mediale

References

External links

longifolium
Flora of New South Wales